From 1878 to 1936, Ipswich Town Football Club was an amateur side and the team was selected by committee. After turning professional in 1936, the club appointed Mick O'Brien as their manager who led them to immediate success in winning the Southern League.  His sudden departure left the club managerless for 11 matches until Scott Duncan was placed in charge, remaining with the club for almost 18 years. Duncan retired in 1955 and was replaced by Alf Ramsey who led Ipswich to further success in the league.  This included back-to-back league championships, winning the Second Division in the 1960–61 season followed by taking the First Division title in 1961–62 season. Ramsey was appointed England manager in 1963 and went on to win the 1966 World Cup.

Managerial turnover at Ipswich was low with only six full-time appointments in 46 years, but after Bobby Robson left the club in 1982 to manage England, the club employed six full-time managers in the following 25 years. David Sheepshanks became chairman of the club in 1995 taking over a club recently relegated from the Premier League and in financial difficulty. Under George Burley, the club failed in three play-offs before finally winning promotion back to the top flight in 2000 after a 4–2 win over Barnsley at Wembley Stadium. Relegation followed two seasons later after a brief spell in Europe and Burley was replaced by Joe Royle. After nearly four seasons, Royle left the club and in June 2006, Sheepshanks appointed former Ipswich player Jim Magilton as the manager of the team. Magilton was sacked nearly three years later after failing to lead the club to either play-offs or promotion. He was succeeded by Roy Keane, who had managed Sunderland to the Championship title two years previously, who became only the club's 13th full-time manager during their 74-year professional status.  He was sacked on 7 January 2011 and was replaced by Ian McParland in a caretaker capacity before Paul Jewell took over as manager on 13 January 2011.

Jewell left the club by mutual consent in October 2012, with Ipswich bottom of the Championship, and leaving Chris Hutchings in a caretaker role.  After a single match, Hutchings was replaced by Mick McCarthy on a full-time basis.  On 29 March 2018, the club announced that Mick McCarthy's contract, which was due to expire at the end of the 2017–18 season, would not be extended.  McCarthy announced that he was quitting during the post-match press conference following a 1–0 victory over Barnsley on 10 April 2018. He was replaced until the end of the season by Bryan Klug as a caretaker manager.  On 30 May 2018, Paul Hurst was announced as manager;  he and his assistant at Shrewsbury Town, Chris Doig, signed three-year contracts. Less than five months later, on 25 October 2018, Paul Hurst was sacked, with Ipswich having won one match from fourteen league games.  Former Norwich City manager Paul Lambert was appointed two days later.  Ipswich's relegation to the third tier of English football was confirmed on 13 April 2019, the first time since 1957.  Lambert left the club by mutual consent on 28 February 2021.  Paul Cook was appointed as manager three days later.  Expectations were high ahead of the following season, but following a series of disappointing results, Cook was sacked in December 2021. On 16 December 2021, Kieran McKenna, assistant manager at Manchester United, was appointed to replace Cook, with Martyn Pert as his deputy.

Managers 

. Only professional, competitive matches are counted.

References 
General

 

 Specific

Managers
 
Ipswich Town